Khuda or Khoda is the Iranian word for "Lord" or "God". Originally, it was used in reference to Ahura Mazda (the god of Zoroastrianism).

Khoda Box may refer to:

 Khuda Buksh (1912–1974), Bangladeshi life insurance salesman and humanitarian
 Khoda Box (1928–1990), Bangladeshi Baul singer and composer
 Khoda Box Mridha (1945–2010), Bangladeshi sports commentator